Norman James (born 25 March 1908 – 12 October 1985) was an English footballer who played as a defender.

References

External links
 LFC History profile

1908 births
1985 deaths
English footballers
Liverpool F.C. players
Association football defenders